Eunetta T. Boone ( – March 20, 2019) was an American television writer and producer. She was the creator and writer of several television series and, at the time of her death, she was serving as the executive producer and showrunner for the third season of the Disney Channel series Raven's Home.

Life and career
Boone was born in Washington, D.C. Her parents ensured that she and her sister were raised "culturally enriched". Boone graduated with a degree in journalism from the University of Maryland and a Master of Science in journalism from Columbia University. She was a sports reporter for the evening edition of The Baltimore Sun, the first African American woman to hold the position at the newspaper.

In 1990, Boone made the career change from sportswriting when she took a screenwriting workshop offered by the Maryland Film Commission. She then later took part in a Warner Bros. writing workshop and jobs as a staff writer on several series, such as The Fresh Prince of Bel-Air, Roc, and The Parent 'Hood. She became an executive producer and concurrently served on two hit shows for 20th Century Fox and Disney's Touchstone Television, The Hughleys and My Wife and Kids. This led to Boone creating her own comedy series, One on One and its spinoff, Cuts. UPN canceled One on One and Cuts in 2006.

Boone also wrote a feature film script titled Who Is Doris Payne? As of 2018, the biographical film about jewel thief Doris Payne remained in development for over a decade. In 2011, an autobiography of jockey Sylvia Harris co-written by Boone and William H. Boulware was published by Ecco Press.

From 2007 to 2013, Boone was a screenwriting instructor with an emphasis in comedy writing in the UCLA Extension Writers' Program. She went on to become an advisor to Raven-Symoné for the series Raven's Home and was to be its executive producer and showrunner for its upcoming third season. The production was temporarily shut down following Boone's death.

Death
Boone died of an apparent heart attack in her Los Angeles home on March 20, 2019. She was 63.

Filmography

References

External links

1955 births
2019 deaths
African-American screenwriters
African-American sports journalists
African-American television producers
African-American women journalists
American television producers
American television writers
American women screenwriters
American women sportswriters
Journalists from Maryland
Journalists from Washington, D.C.
Screenwriters from Maryland
Screenwriters from Washington, D.C.
Writers from Baltimore
Columbia University Graduate School of Journalism alumni
University of Maryland, College Park alumni
20th-century American women writers
21st-century American women writers
20th-century African-American women writers
20th-century African-American writers
21st-century African-American women writers
21st-century African-American writers